Anu Mohan (born as David Stanley, on 3 December 1957) is an Indian actor and director who has worked in Tamil language films. Beginning his career as a director, Anu Mohan has gone on to play secondary comedy roles in films, notably portraying a character in Padayappa (1999).

Career
Anu Mohan completed his mechanical engineering and started his career in the late 1980s, making two feature films Idhu Oru Thodar Kathai (1987) and Ninaivu Chinnam (1989). He appeared in acting roles in the 1990s and notably portrayed a comedy role in K. S. Ravikumar's Padayappa (1999), which garnered him further offers during the period. In the 2000s, he appeared in primarily low budget films portraying a comedian. He was recalled by K. S. Ravikumar to feature in Lingaa (2014).

In 2014, his son, Arun Mohan, made his directorial debut with the thriller film Sarabham, produced by C. V. Kumar.

Notable filmography

Director

Actor

Dubbing artist

Writer
Pangali (1992)
''Maaman Magal (1995)

Television

References

External links
 

Indian male film actors
Tamil male actors
Tamil comedians
Living people
21st-century Indian male actors
1957 births
Indian film directors
Tamil film directors